The Yugadanavi Power Station (also known as Kerawalapitiya Power Station) is a large oil-fired power station in Sri Lanka. The  power station is located in Kerawalapitiya, in the Western Province of Sri Lanka.

Phase 1 of the power station was ceremonially inaugurated by President Mahinda Rajapakse on 8 December 2008.

The  power station was supported by a  debt component through HSBC, which was supported by export credit agencies in the United States, Germany, Netherlands, Poland, France, and Austria.

Specifications 
Built over a  site, the power station will utilize two  and one GE steam turbine, and will generate approximately  annually. The facility uses  of seawater for cooling.

Conversion to LNG 
On September 21, 2021, U.S. infrastructure firm New Fortress Energy announced they have acquired 40% stake in West Coast Power (Pvt) Ltd the owner of Yugadanavi power station along with the rights to develop a new LNG Terminal off the coast of Colombo that will supply LNG to the power plant. The agreement was approved by the Sri Lankan government allowing New Fortress Energy's investment in West Coast Power Ltd. Trade Unions of the Ceylon Electricity Board (CEB)  oppose the agreement and warned the Government of an islandwide power outage after 3 November if it fails to withdraw from the controversial agreement.

See also 
 Electricity in Sri Lanka
 List of power stations in Sri Lanka

References 

Oil-fired power stations in Sri Lanka
Natural gas-fired power stations in Sri Lanka
Buildings and structures in Gampaha District